Jim Mettler was a member of the Ohio House of Representatives from 1999–2000.  His district consisted of a portion of Lucas County, Ohio.  He was succeeded by Teresa Fedor.

References
Former Rep. Mettler named interim seaport boss

Democratic Party members of the Ohio House of Representatives
Living people
Year of birth missing (living people)